Derbyshire County Cricket Club in 1890 was the cricket season when the English club Derbyshire had been playing twenty years. Derbyshire's matches were not considered to be first class in this season. Derbyshire had recruited Fred Spofforth a former Australian captain to help revive the club's fortunes. Spofforth was successful off the field in uncovering irregularities that contributed to the financial difficulties that had bedevilled the club for many years.

1890 season 
Derbyshire played fourteen games, winning seven and losing five. They played the same county teams as in previous years and also minor county Norfolk for the first time. They also played against MCC and the touring Australians. Fred Spofforth, known as the "Demon Bowler" had toured England with the Australians in 1886, and afterwards chose to live in Derbyshire. With the residential qualification met in 1890, Spofforth was able not only to play for Derbyshire but to captain the side. Although the Demon Bowler took 9 for 56 against Leicestershire, it was George Davidson who took most wickets. Levi Wright was top scorer. Derbyshire did not have had a dedicated wicket-keeper during the season.

Matches 
{| class="wikitable" width="100%"
! bgcolor="#efefef" colspan=6 | List of  matches
|- bgcolor="#efefef"
!No.
!Date
!V
!Result 
!Margin
!Notes
|- 
|1
 | 26 May 1890
| Essex   County Ground, Leyton 
|bgcolor="#00FF00"|Won
| 8 runs
| Pickett 5-24 and 5-83; G Davidson  6-47 and 5-58
|- 
|2
|02 Jun 1890
|  Surrey  County Ground, Derby  
|bgcolor="#FF0000"|Lost
| 28 runs
| G Davidson 6-36; Sharpe 5-65; W Sugg 5-44 
|- 
|3
|16 Jun 1890
| Leicestershire  Grace Road, Leicester 
|bgcolor="#00FF00"|Won
| 7 wickets
| Joyce 5-85; GG Walker 7-53 
|- 
|4
|30 Jun 1890
| Australians   County Ground, Derby  
|bgcolor="#FFCC00"|Drawn
|
| Turner 6–16; FR Spofforth 6-42
|- 
|5
|06 Jul 1890
| Yorkshire County Ground, Derby  
|bgcolor="#00FF00"|Won
| Innings and 25 runs
| G Davidson  5-69 
|- 
|6
|14 Jul 1890
| MCC     Lord's Cricket Ground, St John's Wood 
|bgcolor="#FF0000"|Lost
| Innings and 181 runs
| Davenport 158*; Shacklock 5-56 
|- 
|7
|24 Jul 1890
|  Surrey Kennington Oval 
|bgcolor="#FF0000"|Lost
| Innings and 58 runs
| Key 137; LG Wright 122; S Malthouse 5–112; Sharpe 6-79 
|- 
|8
| 28 Jul 1890
| Nottinghamshire   County Ground, Derby 
|bgcolor="#FF0000"|Lost
| Innings and 71 runs
| Flowers 5-19 
|- 
|9
|04 Aug 1890
| Essex   County Ground, Derby 
|bgcolor="#FF0000"|Lost
| 8 wickets
| Mead 6-?; GG Walker 6-?; Pickett 6-? 
|- 
|10
|08 Aug 1890
| Norfolk   County Ground, Lakenham 
|bgcolor="#00FF00"|Won
| Innings and 60 runs
| F Evershed 111; Hoare 5–106; GG Walker 6-27 
|- 
|11
| 11 Aug 1890
| LeicestershireCounty Ground, Derby 
|bgcolor="#00FF00"|Won
| 145 runs
| FR Spofforth 9-56 and 5-58 
|- 
|12
| 18 Aug 1890
| Yorkshire   Bramall Lane, Sheffield  
|bgcolor="#00FF00"|Won
| 52 runs
| GG Walker 5-66 
|- 
|13
|25 Aug 1890
| Norfolk   County Ground, Derby  
|bgcolor="#00FF00"|Won
| Innings and 23 runs
| GG Walker 5–19; Morton 6-57; FR Spofforth 7-26 
|- 
|14
|01 Sep 1890
| Nottinghamshire    Trent Bridge, Nottingham 
|bgcolor="#FFCC00"|Drawn
|
| GG Walker 6-82 
|-

Statistics

Batting averages

Bowling averages

Wicket Keeper 

There does not appear to have been a regular wicket-keeper this season, and no wickets were taken by stumping.

Financial scandal 

By 1890 Derbyshire County Cricket Club was found to be in deep financial crisis. Fred Spofforth played a key part in identifying a fraud that had been committed. The cricket club's losses amounted to £1000 and Derby County Football Club was also raided. In 1880 Samuel Richardson, the club's first captain had become an administrator of the club, and in 1884 the remit was extended to the associated Derby County Football Club. Richardson admitted his guilt, fled the country in disgrace and settled in Madrid.

See also 
 Derbyshire County Cricket Club seasons
 1890 English cricket season

References 

1890 in English cricket
Derbyshire County Cricket Club seasons
English cricket seasons in the 19th century